Surveillance is a method of constant observation that has been used throughout history. While surveillance has become popularized through recent advances in technology, surveillance activities have occurred throughout history.

As Keith Laidler proposes in his book Surveillance Unlimited: How We’ve Become the Most Watched People on Earth, “spying and surveillance are at least as old as civilization itself. The rise of city states and empires […] meant that each needed to know not only the disposition and morale of their enemy, but also the loyalty and general sentiment of their own population.”

In history, surveillance is often referred to as spying or espionage. Most often, surveillance historically occurred as a means to gather and collect information, supervise the actions of other people (usually enemies), and to use this information to increase ones understanding of the party being spied upon. Since ancient times, surveillance occurred most often through the use of an individual spy, or a small group of spies. As technology such as spyglasses, telescopes and radios developed, surveillance technologies continually effected the way in which surveillance occurred. Modern surveillance technologies such CCTV, RFID and GPS help to highlight the extent to which surveillance practices have evolved throughout history.

Biblical surveillance

There are many possible examples of surveillance found in the Bible. One example found in 2 Samuel, is that of David and Bathsheba found in the second book of Samuel. David, while walking on the roof of his palace, noticed Bathsheba bathing and as he continued to watch her his desire grew, even though she was already the wife of Uriah. In this example, surveillance was used for David's own personal gains and pleasure rather than for a greater good.

Another example, as noted by Kieith Laidler, can be found in the Book of Numbers. Here, “details of the information that the spies were required to collect” mostly regarding the land, how many people live on the land, the layout of the towns, the quality of the soil and the presence of trees (Numbers 13: 17–20).  Unlike the story of David and Bathsheba, here surveillance is being used for very different means. By collecting information regarding the people and the land, the spies would have been able to determine the strengths and weaknesses of their enemies. This use of surveillance satisfies one of the most basic characteristics of surveillance historically as well as modernly.

Espionage in ancient Egypt

According to Terry Crowdy in his book The Enemy Within: A History of Espionage:
"the earliest surviving record of espionage dates from the time of Pharaoh Rameses’ war with the Hittites and the battle of Kadesh. (c.1274 BC)…The Hittite king Muwatallis sent two spies into the Egyptian camp posing as deserters to convince pharaoh that the Hittite army was still quite distant. Rameses believed their story and unwittingly allowed part of his army to march into a Hittite ambush. Fortunately for the pharaoh, he captured two more Hittite spies and had his officers interrogate them…the Hittites spies revealed that an ambush had been set…Ramses was therefore able to bring up reserves and avert disaster at what became known as the battle of Kadesh.”

Crowdy makes an important point by recognizing the fact that the precedent for altering general surveillance practices occurred very early on in History. Although most often spies are "known as collectors of information, they are often used to disseminate false information in order to deliberately mislead opponents.”

References

Surveillance